The Phillip Orth Boathouse is located in Minocqua, Wisconsin, United States. It was added to the National Register of Historic Places in 2005.

Description
The boathouse is located on the southern shore of Lake Minocqua. It is two stories tall with a hip roof and casement windows.

References

Boathouses in the United States
Buildings and structures completed in 1926
Buildings and structures in Oneida County, Wisconsin
National Register of Historic Places in Oneida County, Wisconsin
Boathouses on the National Register of Historic Places in Wisconsin